An Italian Romance (also known as A Rekindled Affair) is a 2004 Italian drama film directed by Carlo Mazzacurati. It premiered out of competition at the 61st Venice International Film Festival and was later screened at the Toronto International Film Festival.

Cast 

Stefano Accorsi: Giovanni
Maya Sansa: Maria
Marco Messeri: Franchino 
  Anne Canovas: Ines 
 Roberto Citran: Alvaro 
Luisanna Pandolfi: Armida
Alba Rohrwacher: Collega di Maria

See also 
 List of Italian films of 2004

References

External links

2004 films
Italian romantic drama films
2004 romantic drama films
2000s Italian-language films
2000s Italian films